The Civic Democratic Alliance (ODA) was a conservative-liberal political party in the Czech Republic, active between 1989 (founded shortly after the Velvet revolution) and 2007. The ODA was part of government coalitions until 1997 and participated in transformation of the Czech economy. The party was supported by president Václav Havel who voted for it in 1992 and 1996 election.

History
The ODA was established in 1989 by a group of intellectuals as a conservative-liberal party, based on ideas often expressed in The Salisbury Review. The other motive was personal antipathy to Václav Klaus and his party Civic Democratic Party (ODS).

In 1992 legislative election, ODA obtained over 300,000 votes (5,93 per cent of all votes) and gained 14 seats in Czech National Council. It became part of right-wing coalition (First government of Václav Klaus) together with the ODS, Christian and Democratic Union (KDU–ČSL) and Christian Democratic Party (KDS).

In 1996 legislative election, the ODA obtained 6.36 per cent of votes and again formed coalition with the ODS and KDU–ČSL (the second government of Václav Klaus). However, this government didn't manage to form majority in the Chamber of Deputies and so was depending on toleration of the centre-left Czech Social Democratic Party (ČSSD) (government disposed of 99 deputies out of 200, social democrats of 61 deputies and non-system parties of 40 deputies). Following financial scandals of the ODS, the coalition fell apart. Both the ODS and KDU-ČSL participated in caretaker government of Josef Tošovský.

It didn't participate in 1998 legislative election, in order "to not split votes on the right-wing". The ODA formed the Four-Coalition with the KDU–ČSL, Freedom Union and Democratic Union in opposition to the grand coalition of the centre-right ODS and centre-left ČSSD. However, the ODA became the coalition's weakest member, and after its funding problems came to light, it ceased to take part in the Czech political scene. It only had one senator, Karel Schwarzenberg (Minister of Foreign Affairs of the Czech Republic since 2007). The party ceased activity on 31 December 2007.

Czech billionaire Pavel Sehnal announced in December 2016 that he established a new Civic Democratic Alliance. Leaders of the original ODA weren't involved with the new party.

Election results

Chamber of Deputies

Seats in the Chamber of Deputies

Senate

Seats in the Senate

Presidential

European Parliament

Leaders
 Pavel Bratinka (1989-1992)
 Jan Kalvoda (1992-1997)
 Michael Žantovský (1997)
 Jiří Skalický (1997-1998)
 Daniel Kroupa (1998-2001)
 Michael Žantovský (2001-2002)
 Jiřina Nováková (2002-2007)

See also
Liberalism
Liberalism worldwide
List of liberal parties
Liberalism in the Czech lands

References

External links
Civic Democratic Alliance official site
Short history in narrative form (in Czech)

 
Defunct political parties in the Czech Republic
Liberal parties in the Czech Republic
Defunct liberal political parties
Conservative liberal parties
Right-wing parties in the Czech Republic
Civic Forum breakaway groups
1990 establishments in Czechoslovakia
Political parties disestablished in 2007
Political parties established in 1990